Gompholobium venustum, commonly known as handsome wedge-pea, is a species of flowering plant in the family Fabaceae and is endemic to the south-west of Western Australia. It is a slender, erect or sprawling shrub with pinnate leaves with fifteen to nineteen leaflets, and yellow or pink, pea-like flowers.

Description

Taxonomy
Gompholobium venustum was first formally described in 1811 by Robert Brown in Hortus Kewensis. The specific epithet (venustum) means "charming" or "beautiful".

Distribution and habitat
This gompholobium grows on sandplains, ridges and outcrops in the Esperance Plains, Jarrah Forest, Mallee and Warren biogeographic regions of southern Western Australia.

Conservation status
Gompholobium venustum is classified as "not threatened" by the Western Australian Government Department of Parks and Wildlife.

References

venustum
Eudicots of Western Australia
Plants described in 1811
Taxa named by Robert Brown (botanist, born 1773)